Beech Hill Pond is a lake in Otis, Hancock County, Maine, in the United States. It is 4.5 miles long, half a mile wide, and up to 104 feet deep. Trout, salmon, and other species of fish have been observed in the lake. Bald eagles and loons also live on the shoreline.

Location and description
The pond is located near Maine State Route 180. It is also not far from the community of Ellsworth, Maine. Middle Brook and a number of other small brooks feed into it and Beech Hill Stream flows from the lake.

Beech Hill Pond experiences erosion and also lacks a buffer in some places.

Shoreline
There is a cave located  underground on the western side of Beech Hill Pond. Ice has been found in it as late as July, causing it to be known as the "Cold Cellar".

The terrain at the edges of the Beech Hill Pond is relatively steep.

90 percent of the shoreline of Beech Hill Pond is developed. Development in the area has substantially increased since the early 1950s.

Beech Hill Pond can Be divided in to five distinct areas:
 Turtle Cove
 Schoolhouse Cove
 Beech Hill Landing / Boatlanding Beach 
 Cellarshore / Cellar Cove 
  Beechwood Bay

History
A public boat landing was built on Beech Hill Pond in 1983.

The Pond was allegedly, according to the Town and BHPA, named for the nearby ‘Beech Hill’, which can be seen from the majority of the shoreline. Beech Hill is named for the types of trees found along its rise.

In 2012, the ice receded from Beech Hill Pond on March 21, which is the earliest that it has left the lake since at least 1878. Prior to 2012, the earliest the ice had receded was April 2 (in 2006) and the latest it had receded was May 17 (in 1888).

Biology and recreation
Fish found in Beech Hill Pond include salmon, rainbow trout, lake trout, brook trout, smallmouth bass, and several others. Pickerel are rare in the pond and the white perch population is declining. The largest lake trout in Maine was caught on the lake in 1958. Icefishing is also done on the lake.

Beech Hill Pond was said to be one of the "best bets for Maine lake trout" by Tom Seymour. It is impossible to fish from the lake's shore, although fishing can be done out on the lake.

The pond is a coldwater and warmwater fishery.

A total of 14 adult loons and one chick were observed on Beech Hill Pond in 2007 and 2008. There are two nesting families of bald eagles on the lake.

See also
List of lakes in Maine

References

External links
Beech Hill Pond Lake Association

Lakes of Hancock County, Maine
Lakes of Maine